Joseph Scaddan (1 August 1886 – 21 July 1971) was an Australian rules footballer who played for Collingwood in the Victorian Football League (VFL) and Subiaco in the West Australian Football League (WAFL).

Family
The son of Richard Scaddan, and Catherine Scaddan, née James, Joseph Scaddan was born at Sandhurst (now known as Bendigo) on 1 August 1886.

His brother, Albert, played at Carlton in 1914, and a brother-in-law, Tom Cain, was a successful coach in the WAFL.

Football
A defender from South Bendigo, Scaddan spent just one year with Collingwood. He was one of six Collingwood footballers to play in every game of the 1910 VFL season and was a half back flanker in their winning Grand Final team.

The next stage of his career was spent in Western Australia, where he captain-coached Subiaco to a premiership in 1912. He also participated in Subiaco's 1913 and 1915 premierships, having resigned as coach.

Footnotes

References
Holmesby, Russell and Main, Jim (2007). The Encyclopedia of AFL Footballers. 7th ed. Melbourne: Bas Publishing.

External links

 

1886 births
Australian rules footballers from Victoria (Australia)
Collingwood Football Club players
Collingwood Football Club Premiership players
Subiaco Football Club players
Subiaco Football Club coaches
South Bendigo Football Club players
1971 deaths
One-time VFL/AFL Premiership players